The Archaeological Museum of Agrinio (Archaiologiko Mouseio Agriniou) is a museum in the city of Agrinio in Aetolia-Acarnania, in Greece. It lies next to the Papastrateio Municipal Park and features artifacts dating back to Antiquity and Roman times from the area around Agrinio. It was constructed in 1960 through the donation of the Papastratos firm.

External links
Ministry of Culture and Tourism
www.greece-museums.com

References

Agrinio
Agrinio
1960 establishments in Greece
Museums established in 1960